The following lists events that happened during 1966 in the Union of Soviet Socialist Republics.

Incumbents
 General Secretary of the Communist Party of the Soviet Union: Leonid Brezhnev (1964-1982)
 Premier of the Soviet Union: Alexei Kosygin (1964–1980)

Events

February
 February 3 – The unmanned Soviet Luna 9 spacecraft makes the first controlled rocket-assisted landing on the Moon.
 February 10 – Soviet fiction writers Yuli Daniel and Andrei Sinyavsky are sentenced to five and seven years, respectively, for "anti-Soviet" writings.
 February 20 – While Soviet author and translator Valery Tarsis is abroad, the Soviet Union negates his citizenship.

March
 March 1 - Soviet space probe Venera 3 crashes on Venus, becoming the first spacecraft to land on another planet's surface.
 March 29 – The 23rd Congress of the Communist Party of the Soviet Union is held: Leonid Brezhnev demands that U.S. troops leave Vietnam, and announces that Chinese-Soviet relations are not satisfactory.
 March 31 – The Soviet Union launches Luna 10, which becomes the first space probe to enter orbit around the Moon.

April
 April 8 - Leonid Brezhnev becomes General Secretary of the Soviet Union, as well as Leader of the Communist Party of the U.S.S.R.
 April 27 – Pope Paul VI and Soviet Foreign Minister Andrei Gromyko meet in the Vatican (the first meeting between leaders of the Roman Catholic Church and the Soviet Union).

May
 May 4 - Fiat signs a contract with the Soviet government to build a car factory in the Soviet Union.

July
 July 16 – British Prime Minister Harold Wilson flies to Moscow to try to start peace negotiations about the Vietnam War (the Soviet government rejects his ideas).

October
 October 7 – The Soviet Union declares that all Chinese students must leave the country before the end of October.
 October 11 – France and the Soviet Union sign a treaty for cooperation in nuclear research.

Births
 15 August – Marat Minibayev, former Russian professional footballer

See also
1966 in fine arts of the Soviet Union
List of Soviet films of 1966

References

1966 in the Soviet Union
1960s in the Soviet Union
Years in the Soviet Union
Soviet Union
Soviet Union
Soviet Union